Dwayne St Aubyn Miller (born 14 July 1987) is a Jamaican professional footballer who plays as a goalkeeper. He has won more than 30 caps for the Jamaica national football team. Miller was also part of the squad that reached the final and won the silver medal at the 2007 Pan American Games.

Career

Club career

Tivoli Gardens
Miller started his career at Tivoli Gardens in 2004, before moving to Harbour View in 2005.

Harbour View
He was voted as "Junior Player of the Season" for the 2006–07 season. He featured in the CONCACAF Champions League preliminary round against UNAM Pumas (Mexico) in 2008.

Syrianska
Miller signed a two-year contract in March 2010, with Swedish Superettan (second tier) club Syrianska following a successful trial.

Miller started as the second choice in the season beginning of Superettan 2010. The team were said to have an outside chance for promotion but they succeeded by winning the league and gaining promotion to the Swedish topflight of Allsvenskan. Syrianska had a bad start, with many conceded goals. In the first 12 games, they conceded 20 goals. Around that time, Miller was set to be the first choice. In the following 18 games, Syrianska only lost one game, and only conceded seven goals – with nine clean sheets in the last 11 games. Miller had a huge impact in the team's performances and ended up the season with 21 games as a starter, conceding 14 goals, with 13 clean sheets and a saving percentage of 82%, which was the best of all goalkeepers in the league.

International career
Miller was a part of the Jamaica under-20 squad that reached the final and won silver at the 2007 Pan American Games.

The goalkeeper made his full-international debut for Jamaica in the 2–0 away win against Malaysia in the friendly on 28 June 2007. He earned his second cap against Iran, conceding four goals before being replaced at half-time for Richard McCallum. Jamaica eventually lost 8–1.

He made an appearance for Jamaica in their victorious 2008 Caribbean Championship campaign against Guadeloupe in the semi-final on 11 December 2008. He was called up again to Jamaica to face Nigeria at the New Den on 11 February 2009, in place of Donovan Ricketts who was forced to withdraw with a damaged finger. However, Miller was an unused sub in the 0–0 stalemate whilst Shawn Sawyers started in goal. He played for Jamaica in their international friendly on 12 August, against Ecuador at Giants Stadium in New Jersey, United States.
In 2010, Miller featured in several matches for Jamaica senior national team including a title-winning performance in the 2010 Caribbean Championship in Martinique in December.

Honours

International
Jamaica
Caribbean Cup:
Winner (2): 2008, 2010
Pan American Games:
Runner-up: 2007
CONCACAF Gold Cup:
Runner-up: 2015, 2017

Club
Harbour View
Jamaica National Premier League:
 Winner (2): 2007, 2010
CFU Club Championship:
 Winner: 2007
Jamaica National Premier League: U21
 Winner (2): 2006, 2007

Syrianska FC
Superettan:
 Winner: 2010

References

External links
 Dwayne Miller profile at Caribbean Football
 
 
 Dwayne Miller at Fotbolltransfers

1987 births
Living people
People from Saint Thomas Parish, Jamaica
Jamaican footballers
Jamaica youth international footballers
Jamaica under-20 international footballers
Jamaica international footballers
Jamaican expatriate footballers
Tivoli Gardens F.C. players
Association football goalkeepers
Allsvenskan players
Superettan players
Syrianska FC players
Harbour View F.C. players
Footballers at the 2007 Pan American Games
2009 CONCACAF Gold Cup players
2011 CONCACAF Gold Cup players
2015 Copa América players
2015 CONCACAF Gold Cup players
2017 CONCACAF Gold Cup players
Expatriate footballers in Sweden
Pan American Games competitors for Jamaica
Pan American Games silver medalists for Jamaica
Pan American Games medalists in football
Medalists at the 2007 Pan American Games